"O Superman", also known as "O Superman (For Massenet)", is a 1981 song by performance artist and musician Laurie Anderson. The song became a surprise hit in the United Kingdom after it was championed by DJ John Peel, rising to #2 on the UK Singles Charts in 1981. Prior to the success of this song, Anderson was little known outside the art world. First released as a single, the song also appeared on her debut album Big Science (1982) and as part of her live album United States Live (1984).

The song topped the 1981 The Village Voice Pazz & Jop singles poll.

Structure
In writing the song, Anderson drew from the aria "Ô Souverain, ô juge, ô père" ("O Sovereign, O Judge, O Father") from Jules Massenet's 1885 opera Le Cid. She got the idea after seeing the aria performed in concert by American tenor Charles Holland. The first lines ("O Superman / O Judge / O Mom and Dad") especially echo the original aria ("Ô Souverain / ô juge / ô père"). Susan McClary suggests in her book Feminine Endings that Anderson is also recalling another work by Massenet, his 1902 opera Le jongleur de Notre-Dame. The opera is one in which the arms of the mother—the Virgin Mary—embrace/bless the dying Rodrigo.

Overlaid on a sparse background of two alternating chords formed by the repeated spoken syllable "Ha" created by looping with an Eventide Harmonizer, and a vocoder was used for a Greek chorus effect. A saxophone is heard as the song fades out, and a sample of tweeting birds is subtly overlaid at various points within the track. The two chords of the song are A major and C minor, the repeating "Ha" syllable (a C note) acting as a drone.

The song's introduction consists of a repetition of the "O Superman / O Judge / O Mom and Dad" stanza. The rest of the song's lyrics are loosely structured around a phone conversation between the narrator and a mysterious voice. At first, the voice leaves a message claiming to be the narrator's mother but, upon not receiving a response, reveals itself as someone whom the narrator "doesn't know" but who "knows" the narrator. The narrator finally responds, asking "who is this really?" The voice then identifies itself as "the hand that takes" and informs the narrator that the "American planes" are coming. The song concludes with the stanza "When love is gone, there is always justice/ and when justice is gone, there is always force/ and when force is gone, there is always mom", with the narrator pleading to be held in her mom's "long", "electronic", and "petrochemical" arms.

As part of the larger work United States, the text addresses issues of technology and communication, quoting at various points answering machine messages and the slogan "Neither snow nor rain nor gloom of night shall stay these couriers from the swift completion of their appointed rounds". This line is inscribed over the entrance of the James Farley Post Office in New York, and is derived from a line in Herodotus' Histories (8.98) referring to the ancient courier service of the Persian Empire. The line is also interpreted in the accompanying music video into American Sign Language by Anderson wearing white gloves, white sunglasses and a white coat.

The lines "'Cause when love is gone, there's always justice / And when justice is gone, there's always force / And when force is gone, there's always Mom" derive from the fourth sentence of Chapter 38 of the Tao Te Ching: "When Tao is lost, there is goodness. When goodness is lost, there is kindness. When kindness is lost, there is justice. When justice is lost, there is ritual. Now ritual is the husk of faith and loyalty, the beginning of confusion."

All of this is in the context of an attack by American planes and arms. In an interview with the Australian magazine Bulletin in 2003, Anderson said that the song is connected to the Iran–Contra affair, but she meant the Iran hostage crisis which took place in 1979–1980. Anderson appeared as a guest co-host on WFMT Chicago to say the song is directly related to the crash of the military rescue helicopter outside Tehran — a disheartening incident where U.S. military technology essentially let down the government. This equipment or pilot failure, she continued, was her primary impetus for the creation of the song/performance piece. When it became an emerging hit in the UK, she was as surprised as everyone else, and the need to press more singles to meet emerging UK demand was what led to her first multi-album record deal.

Release
First released as a single by B. George's One Ten Records, the song's popularity led to Anderson signing a distribution contract with Warner Bros., which went on to release Anderson's album Big Science in 1982; the album included "O Superman" and Warner also reissued the single. A live version of the song also appears in Anderson's four-disc box set United States Live (1984).

The song was ranked among the top ten "Tracks of the Year" for 1981 by NME. It climbed to number two on the UK Singles Chart.

"O Superman" did not appeal to all listeners. According to the 1982 book The Rock Lists Album, compiled by John Tobler and Allan Jones, polls conducted by several unidentified British newspapers saw "O Superman" voted readers' least favourite hit single of 1981 (even though the song had been championed by John Peel).

Although Anderson had dropped the song from her performance repertoire almost two decades earlier, she revived the piece in 2001 during a concert tour that included a retrospective look at some of her older pieces, an idea conceived by her companion, Lou Reed. A live performance of "O Superman" was recorded in New York City the week following the September 11 attacks. In this context, certain lyrics appeared to many to take on a more topical significance: "This is the hand, the hand that takes / Here come the planes / They're American planes. Made in America / Smoking or non-smoking?" The 2001 live performance appears on Anderson's 2002 album Live in New York.

The B-side of the original single was a spoken word piece titled "Walk the Dog", which would also be performed in a live version on the United States Live album. The studio version of the track was included on the Warner Bros. compilation Attack of the Killer B's (1983), but was never issued on any Laurie Anderson album until 2007 on the 25th Anniversary re-release of Big Science, where it was included as a bonus track in MP3 and WAV formats.

Recording details
Words and music written by Laurie Anderson.

 Laurie Anderson: vocals, vocoder
 Roma Baran: Farfisa organ, Casio
 Perry Hoberman: flute, saxophone
 Produced by Laurie Anderson and Roma Baran.
 Assistant producer: Perry Hoberman
 Engineer: Roma Baran
 Lacquer Cut (Mastering engineer): Bill Kipper at Masterdisk
 Recorded and mixed at The Lobby  (Laurie Anderson's home recording studio, New York City 1981.)

Charts

References

Listening
Laurie Anderson Record Release Party for “O Superman” 7" 1980-04-28 at The Kitchen (NYC)
Laurie Anderson interview (Speaking of Music 1984-12-06)

External links
 "O Superman" article at h2g2.
 "O Superman" lyrics 
 Laurie Anderson and O Superman article at 'Marking Time'
 Laurie Anderson - O Superman (Official Music Video) by Nonesuch Records on YouTube
 Laurie Anderson's 'O Superman' - John Peel Documentary

1981 debut singles
1981 songs
Warner Records singles
Experimental pop songs
Art pop songs
American new wave songs
Avant-pop songs
Songs written by Laurie Anderson